Settle: The Remixes is a remix album by English electronic music duo Disclosure. The album predominantly features remixes of tracks from their debut studio album, Settle. It also includes the Sam Smith, Nile Rodgers and Jimmy Napes collaboration, "Together", released on 25 November 2013 as a single, and the track, "Apollo", which featured uncredited vocals by Natalie Duncan. It was released on 17 December 2013 in the United States.

The UK edition, titled Settle (Special Edition), combines the remix album with the deluxe edition of Settle and also includes three remixes from the Control EP. The special edition was released on 16 December 2013, by Island Records. Eventually, the Mary J. Blige remix of "F for You" was also added after being re-released on 5 March 2014.

Track listing

References

2013 remix albums
Island Records albums
Albums produced by Hudson Mohawke
Albums produced by DJ Premier
Disclosure (band) albums